Peter Christiaan de Groot (born 9 May 1980) is a Dutch politician, who has been serving as a member of the House of Representatives since the 2021 general election. He is a member of the conservative liberal People's Party for Freedom and Democracy (VVD), and he also served on the Harderwijk municipal council between 2014 and 2021.

Early life and career 
He was born in 1980 in the Gelderland town Harderwijk and grew up in its neighborhood Tweelingstad. His father worked as a building contractor. De Groot studied engineering and policy analysis at the Delft University of Technology. He subsequently started working at infrastructure construction company Strukton Civiel, serving as a strategy and marketing manager between 2014 and his election to the House in 2021.

Politics 
De Groot became an active member of the Harderwijk-Hierden VVD in 2009 and was placed seventh on the VVD's party list in the 2010 municipal election in Harderwijk. He did not receive a seat in the municipal council due to his party winning six seats. He was elected to the Harderwijk council in the next municipal election in 2014, when he was his party's third candidate. De Groot served as vice caucus leader of the VVD until he became caucus leader in June 2017, succeeding Bert van Bijsteren. De Groot was re-elected in 2018 as the VVD's second candidate and remained caucus leader.

He ran for member of parliament in the 2021 general election, appearing 24th on the VVD's party list. He was sworn into the House of Representatives on 31 March, having received 1,093 preference votes. He simultaneously vacated his seat in the Harderwijk municipal council. In the House, De Groot became the VVD's spokesperson for infrastructure excluding aviation, shipping, and public transport, and he is on the Committees for Agriculture, Nature and Food Quality; for Infrastructure and Water Management; for the Interior; and for Public Expenditure. His specialties changed to housing and construction when the fourth Rutte cabinet was installed in January 2022. A motion by De Groot was carried to facilitate the transformation of holiday parks with few tourists into places of permanent residence in order to address a housing shortage in the Netherlands.

Personal life 
De Groot has a wife called Rosalie and two children. He resides in Harderwijk.

References 

1980 births
21st-century Dutch politicians
Delft University of Technology alumni
Living people
Members of the House of Representatives (Netherlands)
Municipal councillors in Gelderland
People from Harderwijk
People's Party for Freedom and Democracy politicians